Polski Konopat  is a village in the administrative district of Gmina Świecie, within Świecie County, Kuyavian-Pomeranian Voivodeship, in north-central Poland.

Notable residents
Aurel Krause (1848 – 1908), German geographer

References

Polski Konopat